The buff-breasted mountain tanager (Dubusia taeniata) is a species of Neotropical bird in the tanager family Thraupidae.

It is found in Bolivia, Colombia, Ecuador, Peru, and Venezuela. Its natural habitat is subtropical or tropical moist montane forests.

Taxonomy
The buff-breasted mountain tanager was formally described in 1840 by the French ornithologist Auguste Boissonneau from a specimen collected near Bogotá in Colombia. He coined the binomial name Tanagra taeniata. The specific epithet is the Latin word for a "head-band". This species is now placed in the genus Dubusia that was introduced in 1850 by the French naturalist Charles Lucien Bonaparte.

Three subspecies are recognised:
 D. t. carrikeri Wetmore, 1946 – north Colombia
 D. t. taeniata (Boissonneau, 1840) – central Colombia and west Venezuela to northwest Peru
 D. t. stictocephala Berlepsch & Stolzmann, 1894 – north Peru to south-central Peru

References

External links
 Xeno-canto: audio recordings of the buff-breasted mountain tanager

buff-breasted mountain tanager
Birds of the Northern Andes
buff-breasted mountain tanager
Taxonomy articles created by Polbot